The 2002 NBA playoffs were the postseason tournament of the National Basketball Association's 2001–02 season. This was the final postseason that held a best-of-5 first-round series; the 2003 NBA playoffs saw those series expand to a best-of-7 format. The tournament concluded with the Western Conference champion Los Angeles Lakers defeating the Eastern Conference champion New Jersey Nets 4 games to 0. Shaquille O'Neal was named NBA Finals MVP for the third straight year.

The 2002 playoffs are best remembered for that year's Western Conference Finals between the two-time defending champion Los Angeles Lakers and the Sacramento Kings, which served as the de facto NBA championship, as the Eastern Conference champions, the Nets, were clearly inferior to both teams, and were eventually swept by the Lakers. The matchup between the Lakers and Kings is regarded as one of the most controversial playoff series in NBA history. At the time, there was widespread criticism of the officiating as favoring the Lakers, especially in Game 6. Several years later, disgraced referee Tim Donaghy accused the Game 6 officiating crew of fixing the game, at the behest of the NBA's front office.

Overview
The 2002 NBA Playoffs marked the return of the Boston Celtics, who had last made the playoffs in 1995. In addition, the New Jersey Nets returned to the playoffs for the first time since 1998.

This also marked the last appearance of the Charlotte Hornets in the playoffs until 2010. The Hornets moved the next year to New Orleans, while an expansion team, formerly the Bobcats, was formed in 2004. The Hornets were renamed the Pelicans in 2013, after which the Bobcats reclaimed the Hornets name in 2014. The Hornets also reclaimed the history and records of the 1988–2002 Charlotte teams. In addition, this also marked the last time NBC and TBS aired NBA games as regular TV partners of the league.

The New York Knicks missed the playoffs for the first time in 15 years, while the Miami Heat missed the playoffs for the first time since 1995. With that, Pat Riley missed the playoffs for the first time in his coaching career.

With their first round series win over the Philadelphia 76ers, the Boston Celtics won their first playoff series since 1992.

With their first round series win over the Toronto Raptors, the Detroit Pistons won their first playoff series since 1991.

With their first round series win over the Indiana Pacers, the New Jersey Nets won a playoff series for the first time since 1984.

Game 4 of the Nets-Hornets series was the final NBA game ever played at Charlotte Coliseum.

Game 5 of the Lakers-Spurs series was the last NBA game aired on TBS.

With their conference semifinals victory over the Charlotte Hornets, the New Jersey Nets made the Conference Finals for the first time in franchise history.

With their conference semifinals victory over the Detroit Pistons, 
and made their last Eastern Conference Finals appearance in 1988. 

In Game 3 of the Eastern Conference Finals, the Boston Celtics created the biggest 4th quarter playoff comeback in Game 3, winning 94–90 after trailing by as much as 21 prior to the fourth quarter. (This record was later broken by the Los Angeles Clippers, who came back from 24 in the fourth quarter against the Memphis Grizzlies in 2012). 

With their Game 6 win over the Boston Celtics, the New Jersey Nets made the NBA Finals for the first time in franchise history, preventing a Celtics–Lakers NBA Finals.

The Lakers’ Game 7 win over the Sacramento Kings marked the first time since 1982 that a road team won a Game 7 in the conference finals.

The 2002 NBA Finals marked the first time since 1995 that a team swept an NBA Finals series.

Game 4 of the NBA Finals was the last telecast on NBC. TBS and NBC were replaced with ESPN and ABC the following season, since both channels are owned by the Walt Disney Company. TBS has aired some NBA basketball in the ensuing years due to conflicts on sister network TNT. The total number of playoff games was 70, including the NBA Finals.

Bracket

Playoff qualifying

Western Conference

Best record in NBA
The Sacramento Kings clinched the best record in the NBA, and earned home court advantage throughout the entire playoffs.

Clinched a playoff berth
The following teams clinched a playoff berth in the West:

Sacramento Kings (61-21, clinched Pacific division)
San Antonio Spurs (58-24, clinched Midwest division)
Los Angeles Lakers (58-24)
Dallas Mavericks (57-25)
Minnesota Timberwolves (50-32)
Portland Trail Blazers (49-33)
Seattle SuperSonics (45-37)
Utah Jazz (44-38)

Eastern Conference

Best record in conference
New Jersey Nets

Clinched a playoff berth
The following teams clinched a playoff berth in the East:

New Jersey Nets (52-30, clinched Atlantic division)
Detroit Pistons (50-32, clinched Central division)
Boston Celtics (49-33)
Charlotte Hornets (44-38)
Orlando Magic (44-38)
Philadelphia 76ers (43-39)
Toronto Raptors (42-40)
Indiana Pacers (42-40)

First round

Eastern Conference first round

(1) New Jersey Nets vs. (8) Indiana Pacers

Although the Nets won the series in 5, it would be most remarkable for more playoff heroics by Reggie Miller; Miller banked in a 40-footer at the buzzer to force OT, and then fly in for a dunk over 3 Net defenders with 3.1 seconds left in the extra session to force the 2nd overtime.

This was the first NBA playoff meeting between the Pacers and the Nets. As members of the ABA, both teams met in the 1972 ABA Finals, where the Pacers won 4–2.

(2) Detroit Pistons vs. (7) Toronto Raptors

This series involved two teams that had exceeded expectations during the season. It was also the first time that professional sports teams from Detroit and Toronto met in a postseason series since the Detroit Red Wings and the Toronto Maple Leafs met in the 1993 Norris Division Semifinals, but no two teams from the two cities have met in a postseason series since.  The Detroit Pistons were coming off a year where they had lost 50 games. The Raptors had lost their star forward, Vince Carter, for the remainder of the season. As a result, the Raptors lost 13 straight games without him. Although they looked down and out of playoff contention, the Raptors went on a surge, winning 12 of their last 14 games, locking up the 7th seed. The home team won each game of the series, with the Pistons winning the decisive Game 5 by 3 points. Raptors' Guard, Chris Childs, attempted to draw a foul on a three-point shot, instead of passing it to an open Dell Curry. In the post game interview, Childs stated that he thought the team was down by four points, not three. Detroit advanced to face the Boston Celtics in the second round. Meanwhile, Toronto, with a 39 year old Hakeem Olajuwon playing his final game, was on the couch.

Game 5 is Hakeem Olajuwon's final NBA game.

This was the first playoff meeting between the Pistons and the Raptors.

(3) Boston Celtics vs. (6) Philadelphia 76ers

This series marked the return of the Celtics to the playoffs for the first time in seven years, and they faced the reigning Eastern Conference champion in the first round. The first two games were played in Boston, where the Celtics won both games resoundingly. The 76ers fought back, however, and with Allen Iverson scoring 42 points the 76ers won Game 3 and stayed alive. In Game 4, Iverson was slowed down, scoring 26 points on just 9-of-26 shooting, and Antoine Walker stepped up for the Celtics, scoring 25. But Iverson's play at the end making a layup, scoring off an Eric Snow steal, and hitting some free throws after Walker drilled a three sealed the victory for the 76ers. This set the stage for a Game 5 in Boston to decide the series. The Celtics had control on this game throughout, but the 76ers kept within striking distance into the 4th quarter. But Boston went on an amazing streak of three-pointers, hitting an NBA playoff record nine of them in the 4th quarter and 19 in the game. Paul Pierce led the way with 46, on 8-10 shooting from downtown, and Boston won in a huge blowout, sending them to the conference semifinals to face second-seed Detroit.

This was the 19th playoff meeting between these two teams, with the Celtics winning 10 of the first 18 meetings.

(4) Charlotte Hornets vs. (5) Orlando Magic

Game 4 is Patrick Ewing's final NBA game.

This was the first playoff meeting between the Magic and the Charlotte Hornets/Bobcats franchise.

Western Conference first round

(1) Sacramento Kings vs. (8) Utah Jazz

This was the second playoff meeting between these two teams, with the Jazz winning the first meeting.

(2) San Antonio Spurs vs. (7) Seattle SuperSonics

This was the second playoff meeting between these two teams, with the Spurs winning the first meeting.

(3) Los Angeles Lakers vs. (6) Portland Trail Blazers

The Lakers sweep the Blazers thanks to a series-winning 3 by Robert Horry with 2.1 seconds left in Game 3.

This was the 11th playoff meeting between these two teams, with the Lakers winning eight of the first ten meetings.

(4) Dallas Mavericks vs. (5) Minnesota Timberwolves

Dirk Nowitzki was virtually unstoppable in this series, averaging 33 points and 16 rebounds per game.

This was the first playoff meeting between the Mavericks and the Timberwolves.

Conference semifinals

Eastern Conference semifinals

(1) New Jersey Nets vs. (4) Charlotte Hornets

Game 4 would not only be the last game played at Charlotte Coliseum until 2004 when the Charlotte Bobcats were an expansion team (the Bobcats would make the first of their two only playoff appearances in 2010), but the last playoff game ever played at the arena. Game 5 would also be the Hornets' last playoff game before moving to New Orleans and then being renewed in 2014. They would make the playoffs again in 2016. 

This was the first playoff meeting between the Nets and the Hornets.

(2) Detroit Pistons vs. (3) Boston Celtics

This was the seventh playoff meeting between these two teams, with each team winning three series apiece.

Western Conference semifinals

(1) Sacramento Kings vs. (4) Dallas Mavericks

This was the first playoff meeting between the Mavericks and the Kings.

(2) San Antonio Spurs vs. (3) Los Angeles Lakers

The Spurs led going into the fourth quarter of four out of the five games, yet were able to win only one. Bryant would pace Los Angeles to 2 crucial victories in the Alamodome with 31 points in Game 3 and a game-winning bucket in Game 4, and would offset the steady production of Tim Duncan (who had a double double in every game including 34 points and 25 rebounds in Game 5) with his fourth quarter heroics. It would be San Antonio's final 2 home games in the Alamodome, as they would move into the SBC Center (now the AT&T Center) the following year.

This was the eighth playoff meeting between these two teams, with the Lakers winning five of the first seven meetings.

Conference finals

Eastern Conference finals

(1) New Jersey Nets vs. (3) Boston Celtics

The Nets won game one, but Boston came back to steal game two in New Jersey to send the series back to Boston tied 1-1. In Game 3, the Celtics were down by as much as 26 points (21 coming into the 4th quarter), but they accomplished the biggest comeback in NBA Playoff history as the Celtics outscored the Nets 41-16 in the fourth quarter. The Celtics almost completed another comeback in game four, but the Nets held on for the victory to tie the series at two games apiece. The Nets won games five and six to advance to the team's first of two consecutive NBA Finals.

This was the first playoff meeting between the Celtics and the Nets.

Western Conference finals

(1) Sacramento Kings vs. (3) Los Angeles Lakers

The 2002 Western Conference finals is widely regarded as one of the best series in NBA playoff history, with the last four games coming down to the final seconds. Two games were decided on game winning shots and Game 7 was decided in overtime. However, the series was marred by controversy and allegations of corruption. On June 10, 2008, convicted NBA referee Tim Donaghy's attorney filed a court document alleging that Game 6 was fixed by two referees. The letter states that Donaghy "learned from Referee A that Referees A and F wanted to extend the series to seven games. Tim knew Referees A and F to be 'company men', always acting in the interest of the NBA, and that night, it was in the NBA's interest to add another game to the series." The Lakers won Game 6 106-102, attempting 18 more free throws than the Kings in the fourth quarter, and went on to win the series, and eventually the NBA championship. The document claimed that Donaghy told federal agents that in order to increase television ratings and ticket sales, "top executives of the NBA sought to manipulate games using referees". It also said that NBA officials would tell referees to not call technical fouls on certain players, and states that a referee was privately reprimanded by the league for ejecting a star player in the first quarter of a January 2000 game. Stern denied the accusations, calling Donaghy a "singing, cooperating witness".

The Lakers and Kings split the first two games in Sacramento. Los Angeles raced out to a 36-point first quarter in Game 1 behind 67% shooting and never trailed, paced by Kobe Bryant's 30 point effort and 26 points from Shaquille O'Neal. Chris Webber had 28 points and 14 rebounds, but the other Kings combined shot under 40 percent. Sacramento rebounded to win Game 2, paced behind Webber (21 points, 13 rebounds) and Mike Bibby (20 points). O'Neal had 35 points and 13 rebounds, but struggled with foul trouble; Bryant shot 9-for-21 from the field and was suffering from food poisoning which he contracted from a meal at the team hotel, and some felt it was done deliberately by the hotel staff. The loss snapped the NBA record 12-game playoff road winning streak for the Lakers.

The Kings went to Staples Center and dominated Game 3 to regain home-court advantage, leading by as many as 27 and never trailing. They were again paced by Webber and Bibby, who combined for 50 points, and got solid contributions from Doug Christie (17 points, 12 rebounds, 6 assists, 3 steals) and Vlade Divac (11 points, 9 rebounds and 3 blocks). Other than a brief 3-point barrage in the 4th quarter by the Lakers to cut the lead to 12, there was not much help provided for O'Neal, who had 20 points and 19 rebounds.

In Game 4, Sacramento again got out to a fast start with a 40-point first quarter and built a 24-point first half lead. However, the Lakers cut the lead to 14 at halftime with a Samaki Walker 3-pointer at the buzzer that should not have counted (replay was not used at the time), and to 7 after three quarters. They whittled it down to 2 on the final possession with a chance to tie or win it, but Bryant missed a running layup and Shaq missed a put-back attempt. Divac knocked the ball away from the hoop in an attempt to run out the clock, but instead it wound up going to a wide open Robert Horry behind the 3 point line, who hit the 3 over Webber at the buzzer to give the Lakers an improbable victory, which tied the series going back to Sacramento. Horry scored 11 of his 18 points in the 4th quarter, including two more crucial 3-pointers. O'Neal finished with 27 points and 18 rebounds, Bryant had 25. Divac, Webber and Bibby all finished with 20+ points for the Kings.

As the series shifted back to Sacramento for Game 5, the Kings trailed almost the entire fourth quarter, but a jump shot by Bibby off a screen with 8.2 seconds left gave them the lead and was the game-winner in a 92–91 win. Bibby scored 23 in all, and Webber had 29 points and 13 rebounds in support. Bryant led Los Angeles with 30 points, but missed a potential game winner at the buzzer. O'Neal had 28 points, but did not take a shot in the 4th quarter and fouled out.

Game 6 is considered to be one of the most controversial games in not just NBA history, but arguably all of North American professional sports history, as numerous questionable calls went against the Kings in the fourth quarter. The Lakers, led by O'Neal's 41 points and 17 rebounds, won 106-102, setting the stage for Game 7 in Sacramento. There are allegations that the game was affected by the referees in relationship to the Tim Donaghy scandal. The Lakers shot 40 free throws overall, 27 in the fourth quarter alone, and the Kings' big men were plagued with foul trouble (Divac, Webber, Scot Pollard, and Lawrence Funderburke were called for 20 fouls, with Divac and Pollard both fouling out). Webber nearly had a triple double (26 points, 13 rebounds and 8 assists), Bibby scored 23, and Divac had 12 points and 12 rebounds. The Washington Post sports columnist Michael Wilbon responded to the calls in Game 6: "I wrote down in my notebook six calls that were stunningly incorrect, all against Sacramento, all in the fourth quarter when the Lakers made five baskets and 21 foul shots to hold on to their championship." For example, Wilbon pointed out that Kobe Bryant did not get a foul called on him after elbowing Mike Bibby in front of an official.

Game 7 was tense, featuring 16 ties and 19 lead changes. In the final ten seconds with Los Angeles up 99–98, Peja Stojaković air-balled a wide open 3, and O'Neal was fouled on the rebound. After O'Neal hit 1 of 2 free throws, Bibby was fouled by Bryant and made both free throws to force overtime. The Kings' offense stalled in the extra period, and the Lakers prevailed 112–106. Sacramento was undone by poor free throw shooting (16–30 from the line), a horrid 2–20 from behind the arc, and a seeming unwillingness for anyone other than Bibby to take crucial shots down the stretch. O'Neal scored 35 and Bryant added 30 in the victory, as all five Lakers starters finished in double figures. Bibby finished with 29 points, and Webber finished with 20 points, 11 rebounds, and 8 assists. Divac added 15 points and 10 rebounds.

This would be the last Western Conference finals to be decided in seven games until 2016.

Announcers: for NBC, Mike Breen announced Game 1, Marv Albert Games 3-7; Bill Walton & Steve Jones joined them as the analysts. TNT had Kevin Harlan, Danny Ainge, & John Thompson on hand for Game 2.

This was the tenth playoff meeting between these two teams, with the Lakers winning eight of the first nine meetings.

NBA Finals (W3) Los Angeles Lakers vs. (E1) New Jersey Nets

In Game 1, the Nets stayed within striking distance, but Shaquille O'Neal's 36 points and 16 rebounds led the Lakers to victory. In Game 2, the Nets were blown out by 23, with O'Neal leading the way again, putting up 40 points and 12 rebounds and coming within 2 assists of a triple double. This brought the series to New Jersey with the Lakers up 2-0. Game 3 was a close matchup with Jason Kidd, Kenyon Martin, O'Neal, and Kobe Bryant all scoring 26 or more points. Bryant and O'Neal's combined 71 points was too much for the Nets to handle though, and the Lakers took a 3-0 series lead. In Game 4, O'Neal put up 34 points and the Lakers won the game and the championship, accomplishing the NBA's second three-peat in seven years. Game 4 is Mitch Richmond's final NBA game.

This was the first playoff meeting between the Nets and the Lakers.

References

External links
NBA.com's 2002 Playoffs coverage

National Basketball Association playoffs
Playoffs
Sports in Portland, Oregon

fi:NBA-kausi 2001–2002#Pudotuspelit